Alan Walker (born 1997) is a British-Norwegian DJ and record producer.

Alan Walker may also refer to:

Sportspeople
Alan Walker (Australian sportsman) (1925–2005), Australian cricketer and rugby union player
Alan Walker (footballer) (born 1959), English football defender
Alan Walker (English cricketer) (born 1962), English cricketer

Professors
Alan Walker (musicologist) (born 1930), English academic and writer on music
Alan Walker (anthropologist) (1938–2017), professor of anthropology and biology at Pennsylvania State University
Alan Walker (social scientist) (born 1949), British Professor of Social Policy and Social Gerontology at the University of Sheffield

Other people
Alan Cameron Walker (1865–1931), Australian architect
Alan Walker (theologian) (1911–2003), Australian theologian and evangelist

See also
Allan Walker (disambiguation)
Allen Walker, a fictional character from D.Gray-man manga and anime series